Valde Uukareda, born 24 January 1886 at Palmse Parish, Virumaa, was an Estonian politician. He was a member of IV Riigikogu. He died at 16 June 1939 at Kuksema Parish, Järva County.

References

1886 births
1939 deaths
Members of the Riigikogu, 1929–1932
People from Haljala Parish